Since the founding of  Israel through the mid-2010s decade, the state-owned utility, Israel Electric Corporation (IEC) had an effective monopoly on power generation in the country. In 2010 the company sold 52,037 GWh of electricity. Until the mid-2010s the country also faced a persistently low operating reserve, which is mostly the result of Israel being an "electricity island". Most countries have the capability of relying on power drawn from producers in adjacent countries in the event of a power shortage. Israel's grid however, is unconnected to those of neighboring countries. This is mostly due to political reasons but also to the considerably less-developed nature of the power systems of Jordan and Egypt, whose systems constantly struggle to meet domestic demand and whose per-capita electric generation is less than one fifth that of Israel's. Nevertheless, while operating reserves in Israel were low, the country possessed sufficient generation and transmission capacity to meet domestic electricity needs and unlike in the countries surrounding it, rolling blackouts have historically been quite rare, even at periods of extreme demand.

Facing the increasing demand for electricity and concerned about the low reserve situation, the government of Israel began taking steps to increase the supply of electricity and operating reserve, as well to reduce the monopoly position of the IEC and increase competition in the electricity market starting in the second half of the 2000s decade. It instructed the IEC to construct several new power stations and encouraged private investment in the generation sector. By 2015, the IEC's share of total nationwide installed electric generation capacity had fallen to about 75%, with the company then possessing an installed generation capacity of about 13.6 gigawatts (GW). Since 2010, Independent Power Producers have constructed three new gas-fired combined cycle power stations with a total generation capacity of about 2.2 GW, while various industrial concerns constructed on-premises cogeneration facilities with a total electricity output of about 1 GW, and which are licensed by the electric authority to sell surplus electricity to the national grid at competitive rates. Also under construction is a 300 MW pumped storage facility, with two more in planning, plus several solar-powered plants.

In addition to the above steps, Israel and Cyprus are considering implementing the proposed EuroAsia Interconnector project. This consists of laying a 2000MW HVDC undersea power cable between them and between Cyprus and Greece, thus connecting Israel to the greater European power grid. If carried out, this will allow a further increase in the country's operating reserve as well as sell surplus electricity abroad.

In 2016, total nationwide electricity production was 67.2 GWh, of which 55.2% was generated using natural gas and 43.8% using coal — the first time the share of electricity production using natural gas exceeded that generated using coal.

In 2015, energy consumption in Israel was 52.86 TWh, or 6,562 kWh per capita. The Israel Electric Corporation (IEC), which is owned by the government, produces most electricity in Israel, with a production capacity of 11,900 megawatts in 2016. In 2016, IEC's share of the electricity market was 71%.

Energy sources

Hydrocarbon fuels
Most electricity in Israel comes from hydrocarbon fuels from the following IEC power plants:

The following power plants belong to independent power producers and, although connected to the IEC’s distribution grid, are not operated by the IEC:

Renewable energy

As of 2019, Israel's renewable energy production capacity stood at 1,500 MW, almost all of it from solar energy, at 1,438 MW. Additional sources included wind power (27 MW), biogas (25 MW), hydroelectric power (7 MW) and other bio energy (3 MW). Of the solar energy, photovoltaics accounted for 1,190 MW, while concentrated solar power contributed another 248 MW from the Ashalim Power Station.

In the same year, 4.7% of Israel's total electricity consumption came from solar photovoltaics. Production capacity of some 0.56 GW was installed in 2019.

In addition to renewable energy, Israel is building multiple pumped-storage hydroelectricity plants, for a total capacity of 800 MW.

Nuclear energy

Israel has no nuclear power generation as of 2013, although it operates a heavy water nuclear reactor at Negev Nuclear Research Center.

In January 2007, Israeli Infrastructure Minister Binyamin Ben-Eliezer said his country should consider producing nuclear power for civilian purposes. However, as a result of the Fukushima nuclear disaster, Prime Minister Benjamin Netanyahu said on 17 March 2011, "I don't think we're going to pursue civil nuclear energy in the coming years."

See also
Solar power in Israel
List of power stations in Israel

References

Industry in Israel
Electric power in Israel